Clark Lake may refer to:

Clark Lake (Jackson County, Michigan)
Clark Lake (Gogebic County, Michigan)
Clark Lake (Washington)
Clark Lake (Door County, Wisconsin)
a lake in Scott County, Minnesota
Clark/Lake station